Matt or Matthew McKay may refer to:

 Matthew McKay (politician) (1858–1937)
 Matt McKay (born 1983), Australian football player
 Matthew McKay (psychologist), founder of New Harbinger Publications
 Matt McKay (English footballer) (born 1981), footballer for Chester City

See also
Matthew MacKay, Canadian politician